Chahar Tol (also Romanized as Chahār Tol) is a village in Baghak Rural District, in the Central District of Tangestan County, Bushehr Province, Iran. At the 2006 census, its population was 33, in 9 families.

References 

Populated places in Tangestan County